Alp is a town and municipality in the comarca of Cerdanya, Province of Girona, Catalonia, Spain. Its population is 1,745 according to the 2012 census.

Alp is home to the ski resort of La Molina.

See also 
 Alp 2500
 Tosa d'Alp

References

External links

 Government data pages 

Municipalities in the Province of Girona
Municipalities in Cerdanya (comarca)
Populated places in the Province of Girona